The 2009–10 season is PAOK FC's 51st consecutive season in the Super League Greece. They have qualified for the UEFA Europa League third qualifying round for the 2009–10 season.

Players

Squad information

Players in / out

In

Total spending:   €2 million

Out

Total income:   €80,000

Pre-season

Competitions

Overview

Super League Greece

League table

Results summary

Results by round

Matches

Play-offs

Matches

Greek Cup

Fourth round

Fifth round

Quarter-finals

One Match, or a replay match on a draw

UEFA Europa League

Third qualifying round

Play-off Round

Squad stats

Squad statistics

! colspan="13" style="background:#DCDCDC; text-align:center" | Goalkeepers
|-

! colspan="13" style="background:#DCDCDC; text-align:center" | Defenders
|-

! colspan="13" style="background:#DCDCDC; text-align:center" | Midfielders
|-

! colspan="13" style="background:#DCDCDC; text-align:center" | Forwards
|-

Goalscorers

Last updated: All matches
Source: Match reports in Competitive matches  0 shown as blank

Disciplinary record

Start formations

References

2009-10
PAOK